Rostyslav is a given name. Notable people with the name include:

Rostyslav Bahdasarov (1993–2021), Ukrainian footballer
Rostyslav Dotsenko (1931–2012), Ukrainian translator, literary critic, author of aphorisms and maxims
Rostyslav Feshchuk (born 1990), alpine skier from Ukraine
Rostyslav Hertsyk (born 1989), Ukrainian foil fencer
Rostyslav Horetskyi (born 1979), professional Ukrainian football defender
Rostyslav I (1110–1167), Prince of Smolensk (1125–1160), Novgorod (1154) and Grand Prince of Kiev (1154–1167)
Rostyslav II (1173–1214), Prince of Torchesk (1195–1205), Grand Prince of Kiev (1204–1206), Prince of Vyshhorod (1205–1210), Prince of Halych (1207)
Rostyslav Lyakh (born 2000), professional Ukrainian football midfielder
Rostyslav Pevtsov (born 1987), Ukrainian-born Azerbaijani triathlete
Rostyslav Shtyn (born 1957), Ukrainian-Canadian musician, producer of music, film and television projects, entrepreneur
Rostyslav Sinitsyn (born 1955), ice dancer who competed for the Soviet Union
Rostyslav Svanidze (1971–2002), Ukrainian swimmer of Georgian descent, specialized in middle-distance freestyle events
Rostyslav Valikhovski (born 1973), priest, political figure in Ukraine, personal doctor of Ukraine President Yushchenko
Rostyslav Voloshynovych (born 1991), Ukrainian football midfielder
Rostyslav Zaulychnyi (born 1968), retired Ukrainian amateur boxer, Olympic medallist

See also
Rostislav (disambiguation)
Rostislavich

Ukrainian masculine given names